Babna Reka is a dispersed settlement in the Municipality of Šmarje pri Jelšah in eastern Slovenia. It lies in the Kozje region to the south of Šmarje. The area is part of the traditional region of Styria. The municipality is now included in the Savinja Statistical Region.

References

External links
Babna Reka at Geopedia

Populated places in the Municipality of Šmarje pri Jelšah